Caryoteae is a tribe in the palm family Arecaceae, distributed across Southeast Asia, from southern India and Sri Lanka east to Vanuatu and northernmost Queensland, Australia. It was long considered a member of subfamily Arecoideae on the basis of its inflorescences, which resemble those of tribe Iriarteeae, and the flowers arranged in triads (two male flowers with a central female flower), which are common across Arecoideae. However, phylogenetic studies based on DNA repeatedly link Caryoteae to subfamily Coryphoideae. Caryoteae do have leaves with induplicate folds, a feature found in most Coryphoid palms, but unlike most Coryphoideae, the leaves are pinnate (Arenga, Wallichia) or bipinnate (Caryota). Phoenix is the only other Coryphoid genus with induplicate, pinnate leaves.

Genera
It contains three genera:
 Arenga 
 Caryota 
 Wallichia

Gallery

References

External links
 

 
Monocot tribes